Ørstafjorden is a fjord in the municipality of Ørsta, Møre og Romsdal, Norway. The European route E39 highway runs along the eastern and southern shores of the fjord. The southern entrance to the Eiksund Tunnel is located along the western shore of the fjord. The inner parts of the fjord do freeze when there are extended periods of cold weather in the winters.

See also
 List of Norwegian fjords

References

Fjords of Møre og Romsdal
Ørsta